Clubul Sportiv Municipal Unirea Alba Iulia, commonly known as Unirea Alba Iulia, is a Romanian professional football club based in Alba Iulia, Alba County, founded in 1924 and currently playing in the Liga III.

Among the greatest achievements of the team is a sixth place in the first league at the end of the 2003–04 season and a Romanian Cup semi-final played in 1991.

The team colours are black and white, and their stadium is called Cetate and has a capacity of 18,000 seats.

History

Unirea Alba Iulia club was founded in 1924. In the beginning the team was called Unirea Mihai Viteazul Alba Iulia. After ten years, they managed to qualify and play in the second league where they managed to obtain the sixth place. They played in the second league until the year 1939 when they were relegated to the third league. In 1942, they returned to the second league where they played two seasons and then were relegated again. At the end of season 1946–1947 we find the team in the third league in a relegating position. From 1947 until 1970 the team plays in the regional championships, under the level of the first three leagues of Romanian professional football. In 1970 the team promotes to the third league. After nine seasons played in the third league, they managed to promote in the second league. In the season 1979–1980 the team finished in the first spot beyond the relegation line. They played another four years in the third league, after that, they promoted in the second league where they played for two years and were relegated again, and after another two years they promoted again. Between the years 1988–2003 they played in the second league. In the 1990–91 Cupa României edition the team reached the semi-finals and in the 1993–94 season they placed themselves on the second position at only 7 points behind the first place FC Maramureş Baia Mare, both performances being obtained under coach Cornel Țălnar.

At the end of the 2002–2003 season of Divizia B, the team, which was renamed in the `90s Apulum Alba Iulia, manages to achieve the promotion to Liga I, where it plays for the very first time in its 80-year history. The coach who led the team was Aurel Șunda assisted by Alexandru Pelici.

Having experienced players like Ovidiu Maier, Vasile Jercălău, Dan Găldeanu, Florin Cotora, they confirmed their value and managed to place themselves on the sixth place in the first league. In the next season the team will change a lot of coaches, Stelian Gherman, Alexandru Pelici, Gheorghe Mulţescu, Marcel Rusu, Alin Artimon, in the hope that the team will keep their position in the first league, but without success. After a very weak season in the second league, the team was relegated again, this time to the third league. In the summer of 2006, the management of the club buys a place in the second league from Oltchim Râmnicu Vâlcea. The team returns to the name of Unirea Alba Iulia and finishes the 2006–2007 and 2007–2008 seasons on 4th.

The club withdrew from the 2012–13 Liga II season and ceased its activity for a year. In the summer of 2014 it enrolled in the Liga V for the 2014–15 season, after one season the club promoted in Liga IV.

On 25 August 2016, FRF invited the club to participate in the 2016–17 season of the Liga III. The club accepted.

In the summer of 2022, after being mathematically relegated to Liga IV but saved by the financial situation of other clubs, the team from Alba Iulia will continue to play in Liga III for another season, this time with the support of the municipality. The City Hall of Alba Iulia announced that in the Local Council on August 9, 2023 it was decided that AFC Unirea 1924 would be taken over and managed by Clubul Sportiv Municipal.

Stadium

The English translation of the name of the club's stadium is Citadel (Cetate), and it has a capacity of 18,000(7,000 sitting). The stadium was opened in 1982. For the moment the stadium belongs to the municipality, all investments are done with funds provided by it. The stadium has also a mini-hotel in which the players are accommodated, and also a running track.

Honours

Domestic

Leagues
Liga I
Best finish 6th: 2003–04
Liga II
Winners (2): 2002–03, 2008–09
Runners-up (1): 1993–94
Liga III
Winners (3): 1978–79, 1983–84, 1987–88
Runners-up (1): 1981–82
Liga IV – Alba County
Winners (2): 1968–69, 1969–70
Liga V – Alba County
Winners (1): 2014–15

Cups
Cupa României
Semi-finals: 1990–91

Players

First-team squad

Out on loan
}

Club Officials

Board of directors

Current technical staff

League history

Managers

  Octavian Cojocaru
  Ioan Ilie
  Gheorghe Borugă
  Alin Artimon
  Gheorghe Mulțescu
  Marcel Rusu
  Stelian Gherman
  Adrian Falub
  Blaž Slišković
  Alexandru Pelici
  Aurel Şunda
  Octavian Grigore

References

 Romanian Soccer

External links
Official website

Alba Iulia
Association football clubs established in 1924
Football clubs in Alba County
Liga I clubs
Liga II clubs
Liga III clubs
Liga IV clubs
1924 establishments in Romania